The Anjalay Stadium is a multi-use stadium in Belle Vue Harel, Pamplemousses District, Mauritius.  At present, it is used mostly for football matches.  The parking area of the stadium is used for car racing and motorcycle racing. The stadium holds 16,000 and was renovated in 2003 for a cost of $15 million.

References

Football venues in Mauritius
Rugby union stadiums in Africa